Yalangachevo (Yalanğas) is a rural locality (a village) and the administrative centre of Yalangachevsky Selsoviet, Baltachevsky District, Bashkortostan, Russia. The population was 211 as of 2010. There are 3 streets.

Geography 
Yalangachevo is located 35 km southeast of Starobaltachevo (the district's administrative centre) by road. Mishkino is the nearest rural locality.

References 

Rural localities in Baltachevsky District